The Master Plan is the first studio album by Australian guitarist Chris Brooks, released on March 8, 2002 through Progmatic Music. The album was re-released digitally on August 20, 2012.

Track listing

Personnel
Chris Brooks – all instruments
Mastered by Kathy Naunton of dB Mastering.

External links
 at Progarchives
 at AllMusic
 at Chris Brooks Bandcamp

References

2002 albums
Chris Brooks (guitarist) albums